Robert Barnett may refer to:

Robert Barnett (lawyer) (born 1946), American lawyer
Robert Barnett (scholar) (born 1953), British scholar of Tibet
Robert S. Barnett, Pennsylvania politician
Bobby Barnett (musician), see 1968 in country music
Bobby Barnett (horse trainer), in Super Derby
Bobby Barnett (American football), see List of Buffalo Bills players
Bob Barnett, fictional character from Home and Away
T-Mo (born 1972), American rapper, born Robert Barnett
Robby Barnett, American choreographer